Fay Holderness (née MacMurray; April 16, 1881 – May 13, 1963) was an American vaudeville performer and film actress.

Family
Fay Holderness was born Fay MacMurray in Oconto, Wisconsin, the daughter of Thomas James MacMurray and Mary E.  MacMurray (née Barnes). Her father was a prominent organist and her brother, Frederick MacMurray, was a respected violinist and a composer, whose son was actor and businessman Fred MacMurray.

The family left Wisconsin in the late 1880s, living in Ohio, Michigan, and later Illinois.

Career

Holderness performed in a vaudeville production in Olean, New York in 1920, a presentation of The Village Four. Three actors along with Holderness appeared in this comedy and harmony singing skit. She performed in silent movie productions as early as 1917. In 1919 Holderness was in the cast of Hearts of the World, directed by D.W. Griffith. The film was shot on location in France over a period of eighteen months. Other actors in the movie are Lillian Gish, Dorothy Gish, Kate Bruce, and George Fawcett.

Holderness was in the cast of Dick Turpin (1925). This tale of romance and adventure was set in old England. The film featured Tom Mix, Philo McCullough, and Alan Hale, Sr.

She appeared in many short comedies, including several with Laurel and Hardy, playing Mrs. Laurel in Their Purple Moment (1928), and Mrs. Hardy in Hog Wild (1930). She also supported W. C. Fields in The Barber Shop (1933) and The Bank Dick (1940). Her career continued into the late 1930s and the era of sound film. Holderness' last screen credits are for Share The Wealth (1936) and Just Speeding (1936). Her uncredited parts take her career into the 1940s. Among these are parts in The Pride of the Yankees (1942) and The Mummy's Ghost (1944).

Personal life
In 1912, she married Francis C. Holderness in Detroit.

She married Edmund Ayars Leeds (1892–1954) on August 25, 1923. Fay Holderness died in 1963 at the Pacific Convalarium in Santa Monica, California, age 82, from arteriosclerotic cardiovascular disease. She is buried at Forest Lawn Memorial Park in Los Angeles as Fay H. Leeds.

Partial filmography

 Hearts of the World (1918) - The Innkeeper
 Bright and Early (1918, Short) - A Maid
 Playmates (1918, Short)
 Hello Trouble (1918, Short) - A foxy spinster
 The Secret Garden (1919) - Mrs. Medlock
 Maggie Pepper (1919) - Mrs. Thatcher
 Men, Women, and Money (1919) - Mrs. Parkton
 The Right to Happiness (1919) - Leah - the Nurse
 Blind Husbands (1919) - The 'Vamp' Waitress
 Distilled Love (1920, Short)
 The Flaming Disc (1920) - Stella Dean
 The Last Man on Earth (1924) - Elmer's Mother
 Dick Turpin (1925) - Barmaid (uncredited)
 Should Sailors Marry? (1925, Short) - Verbena Singlefoot
 One Wild Ride (1925, Short)
 Baby Clothes (1926)
 Up in Mabel's Room (1926) - Tiny (Mabel's maid) (uncredited)
 Salvation Jane (1927) - Captain Carrie Brown
 Ten Years Old (1927)
 Should Men Walk Home? (1927) (uncredited)
 Call of the Cuckoo (1927, Short) - Party Guest (uncredited)
 Their Purple Moment (1928, Short) - Mrs. Pincher
 Lonesome (1928) - Overdressed Woman
 Bear Shooters (1930, Short) - Spud's Mother (uncredited)
 Hog Wild (1930, Short) - Mrs. Hardy (uncredited)
 The Barber Shop (1933, Short) - Little Girl's Mother (uncredited)
 Ann Vickers (1933) - Prison Matron (uncredited)
 Whom the Gods Destroy (1934) - Balkan Passenger (uncredited)
 Among the Missing (1934) - Police Matron (uncredited)
 Flirtation (1934) - Woman on a Window (uncredited)
 Ginger (1935) - Gossip (uncredited)
 Music Is Magic (1935) - Bus Passenger (uncredited)
 Mr. Deeds Goes to Town (1936) - Nurse (uncredited)
 Dangerous Holiday (1937) - Old Maid (uncredited)
 Youth on Parole (1937) - Interviewer (uncredited)
 Let Us Live (1939) - Theatre Scrubwoman (uncredited)
 Zenobia (1939) - Townswoman (uncredited)
 Torchy Blane.. Playing with Dynamite (1939) - Prison matron (uncredited)
 Spring Parade (1940) - Townswoman (uncredited)
 The Bank Dick (1940) - Lady Passerby (uncredited)
 Honky Tonk (1941) - Bricklayer (uncredited)
 The Pride of the Yankees (1942) - Spectator (uncredited)
 Hers to Hold (1943) - Mrs. Kitnacker (uncredited)
 The Mummy's Ghost (1944) - Policewoman (uncredited)
 The Greatest Show on Earth (1952) - Spectator (uncredited)
 Here Come the Girls (1953) - Washwoman (uncredited) (final film role)

References

External links 

brief article on Fay Holderness as a Laurel & Hardy player

Sources
 Appleton, Wisconsin Post-Crescent, Dick Turpin, Wednesday Evening, February 3, 1926, Page 7.
 Clearfield, Pennsylvania Progress, Hearts of the World, February 6, 1919, Page 3.
 Olean Evening Herald, Dorothy Phillips At Palace The Right To Happiness, January 5, 1920, Page 4.

1881 births
1963 deaths
American silent film actresses
American film actresses
American stage actresses
People from Oconto, Wisconsin
Vaudeville performers
Actresses from Wisconsin
20th-century American actresses